Tarucus waterstradti  is a small butterfly found in the Indomalayan realm that belongs to the lycaenids or blues family. It was first described by Hamilton Herbert Druce in 1895.

The larva is found on Eugenia, (in association with Crematogaster ants)

Subspecies
T. w. waterstradti Borneo
T. w. dharta Bethune-Baker, [1918] Sikkim, Assam, Myanmar, Thailand
T. w. vileja (Fruhstorfer, 1918) Sumatra, Peninsular Malaya
T. w. simillimus Schröder & Treadaway, 1985

References

Brower, Andrew V. Z. (May 19, 2008). "Tarucus Moore 1881 The Blue Pierrots". Tree of Life Web Project. Retrieved December 16, 2019.

Tarucus
Butterflies described in 1895
Butterflies of Borneo